The 1965–66 Danish 1. division season was the ninth season of ice hockey in Denmark. Seven teams participated in the league, and KSF Copenhagen won the championship.

Regular season

External links
Season on eliteprospects.com

Danish
1965 in Danish sport
1966 in Danish sport